Annelore Zückert (5 February 1925 – 29 September 2009) was an Austrian alpine skier who competed in the 1948 Winter Olympics.

References

1925 births
2009 deaths
Austrian female alpine skiers
Olympic alpine skiers of Austria
Alpine skiers at the 1948 Winter Olympics